The 2012–13 season was River Plate's first season back in the Primera División, following one season in the Primera B Nacional. Ramón Díaz managed the club.

Season review

Transfers

In:

Out:

Inicial Squad

Final Squad

On Loan

Competitions

2012 Torneo Inicial

Results summary

Results by round

Fixtures and results

League table

2013 Torneo Final

Results summary

Results by round

Fixtures and results

League table

Copa Argentina

Squad statistics

Appearances and goals

|-
|colspan="14"|Players who appeared for River Plate no longer at the club:

|}

Top scorers

Disciplinary record

Team kit
These are the 2012–13 River Plate kits.

References

Club Atlético River Plate seasons
River Plate